Arnoux's beaked whale (Berardius arnuxii), also called the southern four-toothed whale, southern beaked whale, New Zealand beaked whale, southern giant bottlenose whale and southern porpoise whale is one of the species of Berardius. Arnoux's and Baird's beaked whales are so similar that researchers have debated whether or not they are simply two populations of the same species, until genetic evidence and their wide geographical separation led them to be classified as separate. Little is known about their behavior due to infrequent encounters with live individuals.

Physical description

Arnoux's and Baird’s beaked whales, have very similar features and would be indistinguishable at sea if they did not exist in disjoint locations. Both whales reach similar sizes, have bulbous melons, and long prominent beaks. Their lower jaw is longer than the upper, and once sexual maturity is reached the front teeth are visible even when the mouth is fully closed. The Baird's and Arnoux's beaked whales are the only whales in the Ziphiidae family where both sexes have erupted teeth. The teeth in the Ziphiidae are presumed to be used by males for fighting and competition for females. Ziphiidae have the most prevalent and pronounced markings caused by teeth scaring among the cetaceans. Front-facing teeth may be covered in barnacles after many years. 

Baird's and Arnoux's beaked whales have similarly shaped small flippers with rounded tips, and small dorsal fins that sit far back on their bodies. Adult males and females of both species pick up numerous white linear scars all over the body as they age, and these may be a rough indicator of age. These traits are similar in both sexes, as there is little sexual dimorphism in either species. Among the observed differences in the sexes is their size: female Baird's and Arnoux giant beaked whales are slightly larger than the males.

Population and distribution 
Arnoux's beaked whales inhabit great tracts of the Southern Ocean. Large groups of animals, pods of up to 47 individuals, have been observed off Kemp Land, Antarctica. Beachings in New Zealand and Argentina indicate the whale may be relatively common in the Southern Ocean between those countries and Antarctica; sporadic sightings have been recorded in polar waters, such as in McMurdo Sound. It has also been spotted close to South Georgia and South Africa, indicating a likely circumpolar distribution. The northernmost stranding was at 34 degrees south, indicating the whales inhabit cool and temperate, as well as polar, waters. There is no stock report for the Arnoux's beaked whale to date by NOAA.

Conservation 
Arnoux's beaked whale has rarely been exploited, and although no abundance estimates are available, the population is not believed to be endangered.
Arnoux's beaked whale is covered by the Memorandum of Understanding for the Conservation of Cetaceans and Their Habitats in the Pacific Islands Region (Pacific Cetaceans MOU).

References 

Mammals described in 1851

Ziphiids